A Suecophile is someone with a great interest in the Swedish culture and the Swedish language. The term is most often used when this interest is held by a non-Swede. An individual like this is also sometimes referred to as a ″Sweaboo″.

In the language debate in Finland in the 19th and 20th centuries, the Svecoman movement was the name for those who preferred the Swedish language to the Finnish language. The word Suecophile is however more used in non-political circumstances.

A well-known American Suecophile of the 19th century was William Widgery Thomas, Jr., who was US minister to Sweden and wrote the book Sweden and the Swedes in 1892, de facto promoting a better understanding and acting towards Swedish immigrants to the US around the end of the 19th century.

See also

References

External links

Admiration of foreign cultures
Swedish culture